is a passenger railway station located in the city of Takamatsu, Kagawa, Japan.  It is operated by the private transportation company Takamatsu-Kotohira Electric Railroad (Kotoden) and is designated station "S11".

Lines
Yakuri-Shinmichi Station is a station of the Kotoden Shido Line and is located 9.3 km from the opposing terminus of the line at Kawaramachi Station].

Layout
The station consists of one side platform serving a single bi-directional track. The station is unattended.

Adjacent stations

History
Yakuri-Shinmichi Station opened on February 25, 1955

Passenger statistics

Surrounding area
Sanuki-Mure Station, operated by JR Shikoku, is located across the Japan National Route 11 from this station.
Japan National Route 11

See also
 List of railway stations in Japan

References

External links

  

Railway stations in Japan opened in 1955
Railway stations in Takamatsu